Michael Sherwood (27 October 1959 – 5 November 2019) was an American keyboardist and singer.

Biography
Michael Sherwood was a US keyboardist and singer who came from a musical family which included his father Bobby Sherwood, who was an actor, musician, and big band leader; his mother Phyllis, a drummer and singer; and younger brother Billy (Yes, ASIA). His father gave him his first keyboard when he was four years old.

Sherwood (keys, vocals) formed the band Lodgic with Jimmy Haun on guitar in 1977, while growing up in Las Vegas. Also in the band were Mark and Tom Fletcher, and Gary Starns on drums. The band would later include Guy Allison on keyboards (from 1979) and brother Billy (bass, later also vocals). Billy was originally recruited to play less "busy" bass parts than their previous bass player. The band covered Return to Forever, Peter Frampton, Frank Zappa and Yes. They eventually moved the band to Los Angeles in 1980, managed by Barry Morgan, and around the same time began writing their own material. The band met Jeff Porcaro, who along with other members of Toto, mentored them.

After many years of trying to get things together, they recorded their debut album Nomadic Sands, released in 1986. The album was to be produced by David Paich and David Foster, then by Paich and James Newton Howard, before eventually being produced by Paich and Steve Porcaro. Sherwood worked with Toto keyboardist Steve Porcaro during this period; one of their co-writes was considered for Michael Jackson's Thriller album. It was not used at the time, but was then finished for inclusion on Thriller 25.

Michael Sherwood and Jimmy Haun then worked with Air Supply. Sherwood worked on The Earth Is ... (1991), The Vanishing Race (1993) and News from Nowhere (1995).

Sherwood did session work, including backing vocals on the Anderson/Bruford/Wakeman/Howe songs on Yes's Union album (on which brother Billy also performed, but on a different track).

A solo album, Tangletown, was released in 1998, largely written with Julius Robinson, produced by Steve McCormick. Players included Steve McCormick (guitars and vocals), the late Jamie Chez (drums and vocals), Tom Felicetta (long-haired bass), and Dorian Crozier (drums on "Angry as I Am" and "The Censor"), and singers C.C. White, Danny Peck and Michiko Freemond. Guests included Christian Nesmith, who co-produced along with Chez and Felicetta. Mixed by Tom Fletcher.

Sherwood also appeared on Ted Jacobs' 2000 album The Days Gone By, while he and Robinson worked on music for the 2001 film Angel Eyes.  In 2004, he joined Conspiracy, Billy's band with Yes bassist Chris Squire, to record a live-in-the-studio DVD, released in 2006.  Sherwood has also worked with the Gluey Brothers, Jack Russell, Lisa Loeb, Steve Porcaro, Air Supply, Jonathan Elias, and Circa, and further with Julius Robinson and Christian Nesmith.  He has done music for TV shows and adverts, including work for Elias Associates.

Sherwood co-wrote, co-produced and sings on Steve Porcaro's debut solo album Someday/Somehow, released 2016, as well as co-writing material for Toto XIV.

He unexpectedly died on 5 November 2019, at the age of 60 years old.

References

External links
Interview with Michael Sherwood
Where Are They Now? news website
1999 interview

1959 births
2019 deaths
21st-century American keyboardists
Conspiracy (band) members
American rock keyboardists